Vice-Admiral Sir Peter Grenville Lyon Cazalet KBE CB DSO DSC (29 July 1899 – 17 February 1982) was a senior Royal Navy officer who commanded the Reserve Fleet.

Naval career
Cazalet joined the Royal Navy in 1917 and served as a midshipman in the battlecruiser HMS Princess Royal during World War I. He also served in World War II as Commanding Officer of the cruiser HMS Durban in the Eastern Fleet from 1941 and saw action during the fall of Singapore. He continued his war service as Commander of the 23rd Destroyer Flotilla from 1944.

He became deputy director of Plans at the Admiralty in 1946, Commanding Officer of the cruiser HMS London in 1949 and Commodore at the Royal Naval Barracks Chatham in 1949. He went on to be Chief of Staff to the Flag Officer, Central Europe in 1950, Allied Chief of Staff to the Commander-in-Chief, Mediterranean Fleet in 1953 and Flag Officer commanding the Reserve Fleet in 1955 before retiring in 1957.

In retirement he was Chairman of Navy League from 1960 to 1967.

References

1899 births
1982 deaths
Companions of the Distinguished Service Order
Companions of the Order of the Bath
Knights Commander of the Order of the British Empire
Recipients of the Distinguished Service Cross (United Kingdom)
Royal Navy vice admirals